Ralph Wien Memorial Airport  is a state-owned public-use airport located on the south side of Kotzebue, a city on the Baldwin Peninsula in the Northwest Arctic Borough of the U.S. state of Alaska.

Facilities and aircraft
Runway 9/27 has an asphalt paved surface measuring 6,300 x 150 ft (1,920 x 46 m) and runway 18/36 has a gravel surface measuring 3,876 x 90 ft (1,181 x 27 m).

For the 12-month period ending April 11, 2008, the airport had 59,860 aircraft operations, an average of 164 per day: 62% general aviation, 33% air taxi, 3% scheduled commercial and 2% military. There are 52 aircraft based at this airport: 77% single engine and 23% multi-engine.

Airlines and destinations

Prior to its bankruptcy and cessation of all operations, Ravn Alaska served the airport from multiple locations.

Ralph Wien, pilot
The airport is named in memory of Ralph Wien, a native of Lake Nebagamon, Wisconsin, born in 1897. He and his younger brother Noel Wien, arrived in Alaska in 1924 and together founded Wien Air Alaska, the first airline in Alaska. He died when the Bellanca aircraft he was flying crashed in full view of onlookers in Kotzebue on Columbus Day, 1930. Fr. Philip Delon, Superior general of Alaskan Catholic missions, and Fr. William Walsh, a diocesan priest from Oakland, California, who were on board, also died in the accident.

The airport was dedicated in 1951 by Governor Ernest Gruening.

References

External links
 Alaska FAA airport diagram (GIF)
 

Airports in Northwest Arctic Borough, Alaska
Airports in the Arctic
WAAS reference stations